Hat Creek may refer to:

Hat Creek (California), a stream in California
Hat Creek, California, a town in California
Hat Creek (Georgia), a stream in Georgia
Hat Creek (British Columbia), a stream in Canada